Matthew Ridley Corbet  (20 May 1850 – 25 June 1902) was a Victorian neoclassical painter.

Life
Corbet was born on 20 May 1850 at South Willingham, Lincolnshire, was son of the Rev. Andrew Corbet and Marianne Ridley. He was educated at Cheltenham College. 

He attended classes at the Slade School of Art under Alexander Davis Cooper and later at the Royal Academy Schools under Frederic Leighton, President of the Academy. Corbet went to Italy in 1880 and met Giovanni Costa, one of Leighton's friends in Rome. For the next three years he stayed and painted with Costa, eventually becoming one of the leading figures of the Macchiaioli school.

He concentrated on Italian landscapes and exhibited at the Grosvenor Gallery, the New Gallery, the Royal Academy and the Paris Salon.

His Sunrise gained a bronze medal at the Paris Exhibition of 1889; and his Morning Glory (1894) and Val d'Arno Evening (1901), bought under the terms of the Chantrey Bequest, are now in the Tate Gallery.

He died of pneumonia at his residence in St John's Wood on 25 June 1902.

Family
In 1891 Corbet married Edith Murch (née Edenborough).

References

Attribution

External links

 
M R Corbet online (ArtCyclopedia)
Paintings by M R Corbet (Bridgeman Art Library)
 Profile on Royal Academy of Arts Collections

1850 births
1902 deaths
19th-century English painters
English male painters
20th-century English painters
Landscape artists
English portrait painters
People from East Lindsey District
Associates of the Royal Academy
Alumni of the Royal Academy Schools
20th-century English male artists
19th-century English male artists